Roland Suniula (born December 17, 1986) is an American international rugby union player who plays for the Austin Elite as a centre in Major League Rugby (MLR).

He previously played for the Seattle Seawolves in the MLR and the Ohio Aviators as a centre in PRO Rugby. He is the brother of Andrew and Shalom Suniula, who have also represented the United States Eagles rugby union (both sevens and XV's).

Early life
In 2004, Suniula graduated from Kelston Boys' High School which has produced several New Zealand All Blacks players.

Professional Rugby Career
Suniula played for North Harbour between 2005–2008.

He debuted for the U.S. Sevens team in October 2008 in their NAWIRA RWC 7s Qualifier event and has appeared in 13 IRB tournaments.

He played with the Chicago Griffins for the 2012 Rugby Super League season.

Suniula signed with FC Auch Gers for the 2012-13 Pro D2 season. After one season with team he joined CS Vienne where he made 18 appearances for the team during the 2013-14 season. In May 2014, Suniula signed a two-year deal with an option for a third with RC Chalon another Fédérale 1 side.

In 2016, Roland signed to play for the Ohio Aviators in the inaugural season of PRO Rugby USA. On April 17, 2016, he scored the first try for Ohio against the Denver Stampede.

During the 2016–17 season, Roland played for Ohio's Columbus Rugby Club, as well as a coach for the Tiger Rugby Academy.

In September 2017, Roland played with Misfits Rugby in Colorado's Aspen Ruggerfest.

He also played for Rugby Reggio in Emilia, Italy in the Italian Eccellenza League for the 2018 season.

In 2018, Roland played with his brother Andrew for Austin Elite and in 2019, he currently plays with his brother Shalom for the Seattle Seawolves in the MLR.

References

External links
Scrum.com

1986 births
Living people
Rugby union centres
United States international rugby union players
American Samoan rugby union players
Austin Gilgronis players
North Harbour rugby union players
American Samoan expatriate rugby union players
Expatriate rugby union players in France
American Samoan expatriate sportspeople in France
American Samoan emigrants to New Zealand
United States international rugby sevens players
People from Pago Pago
Ohio Aviators players
Pan American Games medalists in rugby sevens
Pan American Games bronze medalists for the United States
Seattle Seawolves players
Rugby sevens players at the 2011 Pan American Games
Medalists at the 2011 Pan American Games